A referendum on the new constitution of France was held in Madagascar on 28 September 1958 as part of a wider referendum held across the French Union. The new constitution would see the country become part of the new French Community if accepted, or result in independence if rejected. It was approved by 77.64% of voters. The country subsequently became independent on 26 June 1960.

Results

References

1958 in Madagascar
1958 referendums
September 1958 events in Africa
Referendums in Madagascar
Constitutional referendums in Madagascar